Lake Constance, in Europe, has about a dozen islands, including some former islands that are now attached to the mainland.

Lake Constance
Geography of the canton of Schaffhausen
Islands of Baden-Württemberg
!